The 2005 European Ladies' Team Championship took place 5–9 July at Karlstad Golf Club in Karlstad, Sweden. It was the 24th women's golf amateur European Ladies' Team Championship.

Venue 
The hosting Karlstad Golf Club was founded in 1957. The first nine holes of the course, situated 8 kilometres north of the city center of Karlstad, the largest city in the province Värmland in Sweden, was designed by Nils Skiöld and opened in 1959. The second nine holes opened in 1968. Another nine holes, designed by Sune Linde, was completed in 1989 and made it possible to combine two of the three different nine hole courses for an 18 hole round, with par 72 on all available combinations.

The club had previously hosted the individual European  Amateur Championship for men in 1996 and the Swedish PGA Championship, for men as well as for women, in 1998.

Format 
All participating teams played two qualification rounds of stroke-play with six players, counted the five best scores for each team.

The eight best teams formed flight A, in knock-out match-play over the next three days. The teams were seeded based on their positions after the stroke-play. The first placed team was drawn to play the quarter final against the eight placed team, the second against the seventh, the third against the sixth and the fourth against the fifth. In each match between two nation teams, two 18-hole foursome games and five 18-hole single games were played. Teams were allowed to switch players during the team matches, selecting other players in to the afternoon single games after the morning foursome games. Teams knocked out after the quarter finals played one foursome game and four single games in each of their remaining matches. Games all square after 18 holes were declared halved, if the team match was already decided.

The seven teams placed 9–15 in the qualification stroke-play formed flight B, to play similar knock-out match-play, with one foursome game and four single games to decide their final positions.

Teams 
15 nation teams contested the event. Each team consisted of six players.

Players in the participating teams

Winners 
Team England lead  the opening 36-hole qualifying competition, with a score of 7 over par 727, one stroke ahead of defending champions Spain on second place.

Individual leader in the 36-hole stroke-play competition was Sophie Walker, England, with a score of 8 under par 136, one stroke ahead of her English teammate Felicity Johnson.

Team Spain won the championship, beating England 5–2 in the final and earned their third title. The win came to be the second of three in a row for Spain. Team France earned third place, beating host nation Sweden 4–3 in the bronze match.

Results 
Qualification round

Team standings

Individual leaders

 Note: There was no official award for the lowest individual score.

Flight A

Bracket

Final games

Flight B

Bracket

Final standings

Sources:

See also 
 Espirito Santo Trophy – biennial world amateur team golf championship for women organized by the International Golf Federation.
 European Amateur Team Championship – European amateur team golf championship for men organised by the European Golf Association.

References

External links 
 European Golf Association: Results

European Ladies' Team Championship
Golf tournaments in Sweden
European Ladies' Team Championship
European Ladies' Team Championship
European Ladies' Team Championship